Mads Rieper Jensen (born July 20, 1973) is a Danish former professional football defender. He is the younger brother of the retired Danish international defender Marc Rieper.

On May 9, 2007, Rieper scored his first Superliga goal for AC Horsens with a stoppage time equaliser against Silkeborg IF. He retired on June 30, 2009.

Honours
Danish Cup:
Winner: 1996–97 (with AGF)
Danish 1st Division:
Runner-up: 2004–05 (with Horsens)

References

External links
 Career statistics at Danmarks Radio 

1973 births
Living people
Danish men's footballers
Aarhus Gymnastikforening players
AC Horsens players
Danish Superliga players
Footballers from Aarhus

Association football defenders